Miłakowo  is a town in Ostróda County, Warmian-Masurian Voivodeship, Poland, with 2,691 inhabitants (2008).

References

External links

Cities and towns in Warmian-Masurian Voivodeship
Ostróda County